"Got My Mind Set on You" (also written as "(Got My Mind) Set on You") is a song written and composed by Rudy Clark and originally recorded by James Ray in 1962, under the title "I've Got My Mind Set on You". An edited version of the song was released later in the year as a single on Dynamic Sound Records credited to James Ray with Hutch Davie Orchestra & Chorus.

In 1987, George Harrison released a cover version of the song on his album Cloud Nine, which he had recorded on his Dark Horse Records label.

George Harrison version 

The first time Harrison heard the song was during a visit to his sister in the United States in 1963–five months before the Beatles first appeared on The Ed Sullivan Show. His sister lived in the countryside of Illinois. While there, Harrison visited record shops and bought a variety of albums. One was James Ray's 1962 album that contained the song "I've Got My Mind Set on You." In January 1987, Harrison began recording the song at his Friar Park home studio, with Jeff Lynne producing and playing bass and keyboards, Jim Keltner on drums, Jim Horn on sax, and Ray Cooper on percussion.

Of Harrison's three number-one singles in the US, it was the only song not written or composed by Harrison himself. Not only was it the last US No. 1 hit by Harrison, but, his last top 10 hit in the US. When the song hit No. 1, it broke a three-way tie between Harrison, John Lennon, and Ringo Starr, all of whom had two No. 1 hit singles as solo artists (discounting Paul McCartney's work with Wings). It also happened to be the No. 1 single in the US the week immediately preceding the induction of the Beatles into the Rock and Roll Hall of Fame, making Harrison one of the few inductees to have an active single on the US record charts at the time of induction. Billboard ranked the song as No. 3 for 1988.

The single's B-side is "Lay His Head", a remixed version of the unreleased song from Harrison's originally intended Somewhere in England album. The 12-inch version of the single also adds an extended version of "Got My Mind Set on You".

In the UK, the single spent four weeks at number two. It was kept off the number 1 spot by T'Pau's "China in Your Hand" becoming the 5th best selling single of 1987.

The song was included in the Harrison compilation albums Best of Dark Horse 1976–1989 (1989) and Let It Roll: Songs by George Harrison (2009).

A live version was recorded for his Live in Japan (1992) album.

In 2010, AOL radio listeners chose "Got My Mind Set on You" as one of the 10 Best George Harrison Songs, appearing at number 4 on the list.

Music videos 
Two music videos were released for the single, both directed by Gary Weis. The first features Alexis Denisof trying to win the heart of a girl in an amusement arcade. While the girl watches Harrison and his band (including Jeff Lynne) in a movie viewer, the young man tries to win a toy ballerina for the girl. He succeeds, but the ballerina somehow drops into Harrison's performance, to the girl's amusement.

The second video, inspired by the then-recently released comedy horror film Evil Dead II, depicts Harrison playing a guitar while seated in a study. As the song progresses, furniture and knick-knacks (including a stuffed squirrel, sentient chainsaw, a statue, and mounted stag and warthog), begin to sing or dance along with the song. In the middle of the video, Harrison (through the use of a stunt double) performs a backflip from his chair and follows it with a dance routine before jumping back to his seat. It was choreographed by Vincent Paterson.

The second video received significant airplay and was nominated for three MTV VMAs.

Personnel 
This is the personnel as listed.

 George Harrison – vocals, guitar
 Jeff Lynne – bass, keyboard
 Jim Keltner – drums
 Jim Horn – saxophone
 Ray Cooper – percussion

Track listings 
7-inch
"Got My Mind Set on You" – 3:51
"Lay His Head" – 3:51

12-inch
"Got My Mind Set on You" (Extended Version) – 5:17
"Got My Mind Set on You" – 3:51
"Lay His Head" – 3:51

Other covers and parodies 
Harrison's version of the song was parodied by "Weird Al" Yankovic on his 1988 album Even Worse, as "(This Song's Just) Six Words Long" poking fun at the repetitive nature of the lyrics.

Shakin' Stevens recorded the song for his 2006 album Now Listen. Irish-Australian singer–songwriter Damien Leith recorded the song in 2012 for his album Now & Then. Irish singer Lee Matthews covered it in his 2015 album It's a Great Day to Be Alive. British entertainer and musician,  Warren James, performed the song following his 2003 live performance for the show business charity the Grand Order of Water Rats—an organisation that Harrison was an active member of. Brandon Flowers recorded the song in 2014 for his 2016 album George Fest.

Charts

Weekly charts

Year-end charts

Certifications

See also 
 Hot 100 number-one hits of 1988 (United States)

References

External links 
 Got My Mind Set On You by George Harrison - Songfacts
 

1962 songs
1987 singles
1988 singles
James Ray (singer) songs
George Harrison songs
Song recordings produced by Jeff Lynne
Billboard Hot 100 number-one singles
Cashbox number-one singles
Number-one singles in Australia
Songs written by Rudy Clark
RPM Top Singles number-one singles
Song recordings produced by George Harrison
Dark Horse Records singles
Music videos directed by Gary Weis